The Principality of Ruhuna, also referred to as the Kingdom of Ruhuna, is a region of present-day Southern and Eastern Sri Lanka. It was the center of a flourishing civilisation and the cultural and economic centres of ancient Sri Lanka. Magama, Tissamaharama and Mahanagakula (now called as Ambalantota) were established here.

The kingdom of Ruhuna was an important state in Sinhalese history as it was known for several rebellions against the superior states in Rajarata. The principality was defeated with its last de facto Queen Sugala been captured and executed by the invading army of Parakramabahu I. Following its annexing by Parakramabahu, the rebellions that arose were suppressed.

History

Founding
Ruhuna was founded around 200 BC by Prince Mahanaga, brother to Devanampiya Tissa of Anuradhapura, after a personal dispute. This region played a vital role in building the nation as well in the establishment of Buddhist culture.

Significance

The kings of Anuradhapura and the Chola kingdom during the reign over a majority of the country, generally fought against the forces of Ruhuna.

Notable Ruhunan militants include: Vijayabahu I, whose armies defeated several Chola generals; and Manabharana II, whose army once conquered Polonnaruwa. The resistances that arose from Ruhuna were generally victorious against the Rajarata kingdom.

Conquest
After Parakramabahu I conquered the kingdom of Rajarata, defeating its king Gajabahu II, he dispatched a force to Ruhuna. The people and army of Ruhuna generally opposed this and established a force against the invaders. While the Ruhunans were able to defeat a prominent general of Parakramabahu's army named Rakkha, they were defeated and their queen was executed.</ref>

Area
The area identified with Ruhuna in ancient times is mainly the Southern Province, a large part of the Uva Province and small parts of Sabaragamuwa and Eastern Provinces.

Princes of Ruhuna

See also
 Provinces of Sri Lanka
 History of Sri Lanka
University of Ruhuna

References

History of Southern Province, Sri Lanka
History of Uva Province
History of Sabaragamuwa Province
History of Eastern Province, Sri Lanka
Sinhalese royalty
Anuradhapura period
Polonnaruwa period
Former countries in South Asia